Rio Shore is a Brazilian reality television series that premiered on MTV Brasil and Paramount+ on September 30, 2021. It is the Brazilian adaptation of the American program Jersey Shore. It follows the same format as the Mexican version. The show follows the lives of ten participants who live in Rio de Janeiro, Brazil.

Production 
The show was announced in May 2021. Because the show was filmed during the COVID-19 pandemic, it followed strict hygiene protocols, in addition to constant testing by both the cast and production members, and everyone involved went through a quarantine period. The first season was filmed in June and July 2021. In July 2021, the series' first teaser was released. The main cast members were announced in August 2021, including Matheus Crivella, known for participating in De Férias com o Ex and Acapulco Shore, Cristal Felix, Guilherme Evaristo, Jessica Barros, Juliana Casaes, Kevin Jolsan, Natallia Fromaggeri, Patrick Salles, Ricardo Salusse and Vitória Araújo. He also has other supporting cast members, including five contestants from De Férias com o Ex, including Martina Sanzi, Bruno Mooneyhan, Gabriel Aglio, Jarlles Gois and Tainá Felipe.

On February 15, 2022, Paramount+ unveiled its new lineup of unscripted series and renewals for MTV Entertainment Studios, including renewing the show's second season. The second season of the show was filmed in January and February 2022. The first sneak peek of the season was released on April 28, 2022. and premiered on June 9, 2022. Four new cast members were announced on May 10, including Aoxi, Cayo Rodrigues, Maryane Valim and William Guimarães. Cristal Félix, Guilherme Evaristo, Juliana Casaes, Kevin Jolsan returned to the show later. Patrick was kicked out of the season during the third episode after he physically assaulted another cast member.

Cast

Main

Recurring 
Throughout the show, the supporting cast was briefly introduced, including former De Férias com o Ex contestants.

Episodes

Series overview

Season 1 (2021)

Season 2 (2022)

References

External links
 
 

2020s Brazilian television series
2021 Brazilian television series debuts
Jersey Shore (TV series)
Brazilian reality television series
Paramount+ original programming
Television shows filmed in Brazil
Television shows set in Brazil
Portuguese-language television shows